Apelaunothrips is a genus of thrips in the family Phlaeothripidae.

Species
 Apelaunothrips aokii
 Apelaunothrips armatus
 Apelaunothrips bhowalii
 Apelaunothrips bicolor
 Apelaunothrips bogor
 Apelaunothrips cephalicus
 Apelaunothrips citricrurus
 Apelaunothrips consimilis
 Apelaunothrips desleyae
 Apelaunothrips fasciatus
 Apelaunothrips femoralis
 Apelaunothrips flavicornis
 Apelaunothrips gabonensis
 Apelaunothrips gombak
 Apelaunothrips hainanensis
 Apelaunothrips haradai
 Apelaunothrips indicus
 Apelaunothrips japonicus
 Apelaunothrips leios
 Apelaunothrips lieni
 Apelaunothrips limbatus
 Apelaunothrips longidens
 Apelaunothrips lucidus
 Apelaunothrips luridus
 Apelaunothrips maculipennis
 Apelaunothrips madrasensis
 Apelaunothrips malayensis
 Apelaunothrips marginalis
 Apelaunothrips medioflavus
 Apelaunothrips montanus
 Apelaunothrips nigripennis
 Apelaunothrips ocularis
 Apelaunothrips philippinensis
 Apelaunothrips rostratus
 Apelaunothrips simpliceps
 Apelaunothrips spinalis
 Apelaunothrips tasmani
 Apelaunothrips tricolor
 Apelaunothrips zonatus

References

Phlaeothripidae
Thrips
Thrips genera